Germanus of Normandy, also known as Germanus the Scot, is a Christian saint venerated especially in Normandy. He was a disciple of Germanus of Auxerre, from whom he took his baptismal name.

In iconography he is frequently represented with a wheel, representing the legend that he crossed the English Channel on a wheel and arrived in Normandy near Flamanville, or with a dragon, representing the legend that he killed a seven-headed dragon at Trou Baligan in the Cotentin.

His aid is invoked for the relief of fevers and for illnesses of children.

References

Bibliography
 Les Saints qui guérissent en Normandie, Gancel, 1998, 

5th-century Christian saints
480 deaths